Lilium martagon, the martagon lily or Turk's cap lily, is a Eurasian species of lily. It has a widespread native region extending from Portugal east through Europe and Asia as far east as Mongolia.

Description
The flower colour is typically a pink-purple, with dark spots, but is quite variable, extending from near white to near black. The flowers are scented. Numerous flowers are borne on each plant, and up to 50 can be found on vigorous plants.

Varieties
Numerous names have been proposed at the levels of subspecies and varieties. Only two are recognized by the World Checklist.
Lilium martagon var. martagon – from Portugal to Mongolia
Lilium martagon var. pilosiusculum Freyn – Russia, Kazakhstan, Xinjiang, Mongolia

Cultivation
Horticulturally it is in Division IX (true species). 

This plant has gained the Royal Horticultural Society's Award of Garden Merit. 

Lilium martagon was used in hybridising with L. hansonii at the end of the 19th century by Mrs RO Backhouse of Hereford, England.

Name
The name Turk's cap lily, also applied to a number of other species, comes from the characteristic reflexed shape of the petals. The specific epithet martagon is of uncertain origin. It has been suggested by one scholar (J.W. Redhouse (1892), that the word is of Ottoman Turkish origin, as mārtağān - a special kind of turban adopted by Sultan Muhammed. However, the word is not found in modern Turkish.

Toxicity

Cats
Lilium martagon, like many in the genus, is highly toxic to cats and ingestion often leads to fatal kidney failure; households and gardens which are visited by cats are strongly advised against keeping this plant or placing dried flowers where a cat may brush against them and become dusted with pollen which they then consume while cleaning. Suspected cases require urgent veterinary attention. Rapid treatment with activated charcoal and/or induced vomiting can reduce the amount of toxin absorbed (this is time-sensitive so in some cases vets may advise doing it at home), and large amounts of fluid by IV can reduce damage to kidneys to increase the chances of survival.

References

External links
 
 

martagon
Flora of Asia
Flora of Europe
Garden plants
Plants described in 1753
Taxa named by Carl Linnaeus